The Scottish Family Party (SFP) is a socially conservative political party in Scotland. The SFP formed in 2017. It is led by former UKIP member Richard Lucas.

The SFP contested their first seats in the 2019 UK general election, and also fielded candidates at the 2021 Scottish Parliament election and the 2022 Scottish local elections, but has never won any seats.

In their annual State of Hate report, the anti-fascism organisation, Hope Not Hate, profiled the SFP in a section on far-right groups in the UK.

Party ideology and policy

Social issues 
When launched, the SFP said its "central goal" was to gain election to the Scottish Parliament and "to fill the void" left behind by the current parties and their abandoning of "Judeo-Christian-inspired values of traditional Western civilisation". According to party leader Richard Lucas, they intend to be the party "to confront the cosy Holyrood consensus, interrupting the monochrome virtue-signalling that currently passes for debate in many areas". It also aims to be a "pro-family, pro-marriage, pro-life, pro-freedom of speech, anti-identity politics, that values the complementary contributions of men and women and recommends schools refocus on education instead of social engineering, radical gender ideology and political moulding". The SFP is pro-Brexit and anti-abortion. The SFP does not want to reduce the gender pay gap, saying this merely reflects the "natural differences" between men and women.

Family 
The SFP argues in favour of more autonomy for families whilst also demanding a crackdown on underage sex. Rather than allowing a pastoral and care-centric approach, the party would seek to police children aged 13–15 having sexual relations. They also want to relax domestic abuse law so that it is less "vaguely defined" and make divorce less accessible as "marriage [is] a solemn, lifelong commitment." 

The party would ban non-heterosexual couples from accessing any fertility treatment on the NHS, disagree on allowing same-sex couple from having children, and oppose any move to define marriage as anything other than a lifetime partnership between a man and women.

Education 
The SFP believes that education should increase its focus on "traditional focuses" of "discipline, knowledge, formal teaching, and objective testing." They argue against the Curriculum for Excellence as it, "elevates subjective learner experience over teaching, undermining the intellectual authority of teachers, and uses student motivation and enjoyment as the measure of what is worth knowing."

Lucas has spoken out against rainbow flags being displayed in schools. The party is opposed to the inclusion of certain content in sex education such as LGBT and pornographic topics. It supports education that includes the promotion of family planning and abstinence from alcohol use.

Controversies 
In August 2017, Lucas defended comments that compared same-sex marriage to incest. Additionally, he denied that he had posted a joke about the murder of Jo Cox shortly after her death.

In January 2019, the Aberdeen Altens Hotel cancelled an SFP event after a public backlash in response to the party's views. Members of the public threatened to boycott of the hotel if the meeting was allowed.

The party submitted a complaint concerning a school celebration as part of LGBT History Month in February 2020. HappyFest celebrated LGBT arts (including drag, theatre, poetry, dance, and music) at Dunbar Grammar School, but the SFP claimed that the acts promoted "a philosophy of gender fluidity that is confusing and dangerous to young people" and that "the drag scene is often associated with less than positive values." A spokesperson for the East Lothian Council denied this, stating that they "strongly refute any suggestion that we 'promote a philosophy' that is 'confusing and dangerous to young people'." The Council spokeswoman went on to comment, "HappyFest is organised to raise awareness and challenge prejudice. It's a community event that celebrates creative expression and the arts."

According to The Ferret, Lucas was revealed on 27 July 2020 to have breached electoral law by failing to submit a record of his personal campaign spending after running in the 2019 general election.

The SFP were refused entry to an Edinburgh pub in September 2021 after the owners discovered who they were. When staff from the Outhouse bar in New Town found out that the "academics" who had booked a table at the venue were SFP members, they told them that their political views "do not align with the venue".

On 29 August 2022, the SFP tweeted a picture of Scottish First Minister Nicola Sturgeon outside Auschwitz, with a cartoon-like thought bubble reading: "There should have been a buffer zone around this place." Green MSP Gillian Mackay, a leading campaigner for buffer zones around abortion clinics targeted by anti-abortion protesters, described the meme as "crass, insensitive and shameful". She said: "The Scottish Family Party are a disgraceful and extreme party that has been rejected time and again by the people of Scotland. Even by their standards, this is appalling."

The party was criticised when Richard Lucas publicised plans to protest at a sexual health clinic in Sandyford, Glasgow as of November 2022. In October and December 2022, the party held protests at the Scottish Parliament opposing reform to the Gender Recognition Act. At the protest, Lucas was interviewed on camera by Simon Crane, the organiser of the far right group Patriotic Alternative Scotland. A Scottish Greens spokesperson said: "Patriotic Alternative is an extreme and hateful group that peddles misinformation and prejudice. The fact that they would want to speak to and promote the Scottish Family Party tells us everything we need to know about both of them."

Electoral history 
The SFP contested the 2021 Scottish Parliament election, fielding 84 candidates. They then received 2,734 constituency votes and 16,085 list votes, but won no seats. It also contested the 2022 Scottish local elections, gaining 6,857 first-preference votes but again winning no seats.

Scottish Parliament

Local elections

References 

Anti-abortion organisations in the United Kingdom
Anti-LGBT sentiment
Christian political parties in the United Kingdom
Conservative parties in the United Kingdom
Eurosceptic parties in the United Kingdom
Far-right politics in Scotland
Opposition to feminism
Political parties in Scotland
Right-wing parties in the United Kingdom
Social conservative parties